The 15211 / 15212 Jan Nayak Express is an Express train belonging to East Central Railway zone that runs between  and  in India. It is currently being operated with 15211/15212 train numbers on a daily basis.

This train is named after and in honor to Karpoori Thakur(Jan Nayak), a freedom fighter & ex-Chief Minister of Bihar state

Service

The 15211/Jan Nayak Express has an average speed of 46 km/hr and covers 1486 km in 32h 25m. The 15212/Jan Nayak Express has an average speed of 47 km/hr and covers 1486 km in 31h 55m.

Route & Halts 

The important halts of the train are:

Coach composition

The train has standard ICF rakes with a max speed of 110 kmph. The train consists of 23 coaches:

 21 General Unreserved
 2 Seating cum Luggage Rake

Traction

From Samastipur, the train is hauled by a Ghaziabad Loco Shed-based WAP-5 electric locomotive up till Amritsar, and vice versa.

Rake sharing

The train shares its rake with 15275/15276 Saharsa–Barauni Express.

Direction reversal

The train reverses its direction 1 times:

See also 

 Darbhanga Junction railway station
 Amritsar Junction railway station
 Saharsa–Barauni Express

Notes

References

External links 

 15211/Jan Nayak Express
 15212/Jan Nayak Express

Transport in Darbhanga
Transport in Amritsar
Named passenger trains of India
Rail transport in Uttar Pradesh
Rail transport in Bihar
Rail transport in Uttarakhand
Rail transport in Haryana
Rail transport in Punjab, India
Railway services introduced in 2009
Express trains in India